Stone House — or Stonehouse — may refer to:

Communities

Canada 
Stonehouse, Nova Scotia

United Kingdom 
 Stone House, Cumbria, England
 Stonehouse, Gloucestershire, a town now in Stroud District, England
 Stonehouse, Plymouth, a former town in England
 Stonehouse, South Lanarkshire, Scotland

United States 
 Stone House, Nevada, an unincorporated community
 Stone House, West Virginia

Buildings

Australia
 Stonehouse, Moore, Queensland, Australia

China 
 Stone House (Diamond Hill), the last structure remaining from the former Tai Hom squatter village in Hong Kong

India 
 Stone House, Ooty

United Kingdom 
 Stone House, Deptford, London
 Stone House, Hawes, North Yorkshire

United States 
 Stone House (Fayetteville, Arkansas)
 Stone House (Arcata, California), on the National Register of Historic Places listings in Humboldt County, California
 Stone House of John Marsh, in Contra Costa County, California
 Stone House (Lake County, California)
 Stone House (Sun Valley, California), on the List of Los Angeles Historic-Cultural Monuments in the San Fernando Valley
 Stone House (Lakewood, Colorado), on the National Register of Historic Places listings in Jefferson County, Colorado
 Stone House (Le Claire, Iowa)
 Stone House (Portland, Oregon)
 Stone House (Bridgton, Maine)
 Stone House (Taunton, Massachusetts)
 Stone Houses (St. Louis, Missouri), on the National Register of Historic Places listings in St. Louis, Missouri
 Stone House by the Stone House Brook the "Old Stone House", South Orange, New Jersey, on National Register of Historic Places in Essex County, New Jersey
 Ralph Hardesty Stone House the "Old Stone House", on the National Register of Historic Places listings in Muskingum County, Ohio
 Stone House (New Berlin, Ohio), on the National Register of Historic Places listings in Erie County, Ohio
 Clemuel Ricketts Mansion in Sullivan County, Pennsylvania
 Stone House (Lexington, Virginia)
 Sloan–Parker House, near Junction, West Virginia

Yemen 
 Dar al-Hajar, a palace near Sana‘a

Other uses 
 Stonehouse (Bristol Road) railway station, disused; in Stonehouse, Gloucestershire, England
 Stonehouse (surname), several people
 Stonehouse railway station, in Stonehouse, Gloucestershire, England
 Stonehouse (TV series), 2023 docudrama about British politician John Stonehouse 
 Stone House, a 2001 album by George Lynch
 Shiwu or Stonehouse (1272–1352), Chinese Chan poet and hermit

See also
 Old Stone House (disambiguation)
 
 
 
 
 Cobblestone House (disambiguation)
 Dry stone hut
 Stonhouse (disambiguation)
 Stone (disambiguation)
 House (disambiguation)